The 1903 Brooklyn Superbas season was a season in Major League Baseball. The Superbas began their slide from contention in the National League by finishing in fifth place.

Offseason 
 January 30, 1903: Jack Doyle was purchased by the Superbas from the Washington Senators.
 February 17, 1903: Henry Thielman was purchased by the Superbas from the Cincinnati Reds.
 February 17, 1903: Rube Vickers was purchased by the Superbas from the Cincinnati Reds.

Regular season

Season standings

Record vs. opponents

Notable transactions 
 September 5, 1903: Tom McCreery was purchased from the Superbas by the Boston Beaneaters.

Roster

Player stats

Batting

Starters by position 
Note: Pos = Position; G = Games played; AB = At bats; R = Runs; H = Hits; Avg. = Batting average; HR = Home runs; RBI = Runs batted in; SB = Stolen bases

Other batters 
Note: G = Games played; AB = At bats; R = Runs; H = Hits; Avg. = Batting average; HR = Home runs; RBI = Runs batted in; SB = Stolen bases

Pitching

Starting pitchers 
Note: G = Games pitched; Games started; IP = Innings pitched; W = Wins; L = Losses; ERA = Earned run average; BB = Bases on balls; SO = Strikeouts; CG = Complete games

Other pitchers 
Note: G = Games pitched; GS = Games started; IP = Innings pitched; W = Wins; L = Losses; ERA = Earned run average; BB = Bases on balls; SO = Strikeouts; CG = Complete games

Relief pitchers 
Note: G = Games pitched; IP = Innings pitched; W = Wins; L = Losses; SV = Saves; ERA = Earned run average; BB = Bases on balls; SO = Strikeouts

Notes

References 
Baseball-Reference season page
Baseball Almanac season page

External links 
1903 Brooklyn Superbas uniform
Brooklyn Dodgers reference site
Acme Dodgers page 
Retrosheet

Los Angeles Dodgers seasons
Brooklyn Superbas
Brooklyn Superbas
1900s in Brooklyn
Park Slope